Mahmoud Hassan (Arabic:محمود حسن) (born 1 July 1984) is an Emirati footballer. He currently plays for Dibba Al-Hisn as a defender.

Not to be confused with Egyptian footballer Mahmoud Hassan, commonly known as Trézéguet

External links

References

Emirati footballers
1984 births
Living people
Al-Nasr SC (Dubai) players
Emirates Club players
Hatta Club players
Dibba Al-Hisn Sports Club players
Al Hamriyah Club players
Emirati people of Baloch descent
UAE First Division League players
UAE Pro League players
Association football defenders